Harry Eyre Pearson (7 August 1851 – 8 July 1903) was an English first-class cricketer, who played four matches for Yorkshire County Cricket Club between 1878 and 1880.

Born in Attercliffe, Sheffield, Yorkshire, England, Pearson was a right arm round arm bowler, who bowled both pace and spin and took 5 wickets at an average of 18.00, with a best return of 4 for 37 against Surrey.  A right-handed batsman, he scored 31 runs with a highest score of 10 not out against Middlesex.

Pearson died in July 1903, in Nether Edge, Sheffield.

References

External links
Cricinfo Profile

1851 births
1903 deaths
Yorkshire cricketers
Cricketers from Sheffield
English cricketers
English cricketers of 1864 to 1889